Educational Pictures, also known as Educational Film Exchanges, Inc. or Educational Films Corporation of America, was an American film production and film distribution company founded in 1916 by Earle (E. W.) Hammons (1882–1962). Educational primarily distributed short subjects; it is best known for its series of comedies starring Buster Keaton (1934-37) and the earliest screen appearances of Shirley Temple (1932-34). The company ceased production in 1938, and finally closed in 1940 when its film library was sold at auction.

Success with silents 

Hammons established the company to make instructional films for schools, but making comedies for theatrical release proved more lucrative. Educational did issue many educational, travelogue, and novelty shorts, but its main enterprise became comedy. Educational's heyday was the 1920s, when the popular silent comedies of Al St. John, Lupino Lane, Lige Conley, Lloyd Hamilton, and Monty Collins complemented many a moviehouse bill as "the spice of the program." During the 1920s, most of the comedies were produced by Jack White. In 1924 Educational quietly hired two leading figures in the comedy community who had been disgraced in a scandal: comedian Roscoe "Fatty" Arbuckle (who became a director at Educational under the pseudonym William Goodrich) and director Fred Fishback (under the pseudonym Fred Hibbard). 

Educational also released silent cartoons, including the Felix the Cat series. In 1930, cartoonist Paul Terry signed with Educational to distribute his Terrytoons animated cartoons in America and British countries.

Sound films 
Educational made a smooth transition to sound movies by handling the early talking comedies of pioneer producer Mack Sennett. Sennett also introduced singing star Bing Crosby to movie audiences. But Sennett soon became plagued by financial problems, and he left Educational in 1932. Most of Educational's silent stars made only a few talkies for the studio: Lupino Lane left the company in 1930, followed by Lloyd Hamilton in 1931. Most of the earliest Educational talkies feature silent-comedy veterans with stage experience: Vernon Dent, Harry Gribbon, Raymond McKee, Edward Everett Horton, Daphne Pollard, and Ford Sterling. Educational's most prolific comedian in the 1930s was the Sennett star Andy Clyde, who made 54 comedies.

Educational replaced the Sennett films with star-name comedians. Andy Clyde and Harry Langdon led Educational's release schedule for a few years, and then Buster Keaton headlined a series that yielded 16 popular two-reel comedies.

For a time Educational maintained studios on both coasts. The Hollywood productions, in addition to those of Clyde, Langdon, and Keaton, hosted comedy stars Moran and Mack, Edgar Kennedy, and Ernest Truex. New York-based talent from vaudeville and radio starred in Educational's East Coast productions based at the Astoria Studios: Joe Cook, Tim and Irene Ryan, actor-singers Sylvia Froos and Warren Hull, the comedy team of Tom Howard and George Shelton, and Stoopnagle and Budd. 

Educational's releasing arrangement with Twentieth Century-Fox resulted in Educational becoming Fox's "farm team," introducing new talent that Fox would take over for feature films. Shirley Temple, The Ritz Brothers, Joan Davis, and Leah Ray all won Fox contracts after starring for Educational. Many stars made debuts in Educational shorts: Bob Hope, Milton Berle, June Allyson, Imogene Coca, and Danny Kaye in New York; and Roy Rogers and the Sons of the Pioneers in Hollywood.

Series

Like other short-subject producers, Educational Pictures marketed its assorted offerings in individual series. Among these were [Robert] Bruce Scenics (travelogues, 1918–1920), Lyman Howe's Hodge Podge (miscellaneous human-interest shorts; the series outlived its creator); Treasure Chest (miscellaneous subjects); Coronet Comedies (single-reel subjects, 1929–1931 and 1934–1936); Lloyd Hamilton Talking Comedies (1929–1931); Cameo Comedies (single-reel, 1931–1932); Tuxedo Comedies (two-reel, 1924–1931 and 1935–1936); Ideal Comedies (1930–1932); Vanity Comedies (1931–1932); Baby Burlesks (Shirley Temple, one-reel, 1932–1933), Frolics of Youth (Frank Coghlan, Jr. and Shirley Temple, two-reel, 1932–1934), Marriage Wow Comedies (comprising only three two-reel comedies, starring husband-and-wife comics, 1934); Star Personality Comedies (Buster Keaton, Joe Cook, Willie Howard, two-reel, 1934–1938); Young Romance Comedies (two-reel, 1934–1935); Song and Comedy Hits (one-reel musical comedies, 1935–1938); and Col. Stoopnagle's Cavalcade of Stuff (Educational's last and briefest series – only two one-reel comedies issued just before the studio closed its doors, 1939).

Buster Keaton
Buster Keaton, despite a successful feature-film career, had experienced personal problems and was fired from MGM in 1933. He accepted an offer to make a film in Europe. Upon his return to Hollywood in 1934, he made a screen comeback with Educational in a series of two-reel comedies. Most of these are simple visual comedies, with many of the gags supplied by Keaton himself, often recycling ideas from his family vaudeville act and his earlier films. The high point in this series is Grand Slam Opera (1936), featuring Buster in his own screenplay as an amateur-hour contestant. 

By 1936, for economic reasons, Educational had been concentrating its production in New York. Earle Hammons invited Keaton to make comedies there, perhaps in a bid for Keaton to relocate. Keaton agreed to three New York productions, but returned to California where he finished out his Educational series. Buster Keaton was Educational's most expensive talent and Hammons, forced to economize, could no longer afford the comedian's services. Hammons closed the west coast studio after the last Keaton short was completed.

Ambition and failure
During its last year of production (1937-1938), Educational confined filming to New York. Hammons replaced Buster Keaton with Broadway comic Willie Howard, who appeared as the Hebrew Frenchman "Pierre Ginsbairge." Hammons also signed Bert Lahr for two-reelers, and continued the musical-comedy series with dancers Buster West and Tom Patricola. The remainder of the Educational series focused on youth: the comedy/dance team of Herman Timberg, Jr. and Pat Rooney, Jr., singers Niela Goodelle and Lee Sullivan, mild-mannered comic Charles Kemper, wisecracking comedian Harriet Hutchins, juvenile singing group The Cabin Kids, rubber-faced clown Imogene Coca, and up-and-coming dialect comedian Danny Kaye.

Twentieth Century-Fox and its predecessor, Fox Film Corporation, had been distributing Educational product to theaters. It has long been thought that Fox dropped its line of short comedies in 1938 and withdrew its financial support from Educational, but in fact it was the other way around: it was Earle Hammons who discontinued Educational's short-subject production, allowed his agreement with Fox to expire, and declined to renew it. Other studios approached Hammons with similar distribution deals for short subjects, but Hammons was anxious to enter the feature-film market. He joined forces with the financially troubled Grand National Pictures, in the hope of producing both full-length films and short subjects for that studio. 

Hammons had stockpiled enough shorts to keep Educational going through June 1938; these films were distributed by Fox. The last two Educational shorts appeared in January 1939, released through Grand National; these were newsreel satires with radio and screen comic F. Chase Taylor as "Col. Stoopnagle." Hammons spent most of 1938 and 1939 in negotiations to secure financing and reimburse creditors. He remained optimistic, announcing a new slate of 26 single-reel films and 18 two-reel comedies for 1939-40 under the Educational banner, but the drain on his finances forced both Grand National and Educational into bankruptcy.

The film library was sold at auction in 1940. Most of the Educational sound shorts were obtained by Astor Pictures, which shrewdly timed its re-releases to cash in on certain performers' popularity. Astor compiled four feature-length comedies showcasing, in turn, Shirley Temple (Our Girl Shirley, 1942), Danny Kaye (The Birth of a Star, 1945), Bing Crosby (The Road to Hollywood, 1947), and Bob Hope and Milton Berle (It Pays to Be Funny, 1948).

Much of Educational's silent film library was lost in a 1937 fire at the 20th Century-Fox film storage facility, but the sound comedies survive today. On October 21, 2017 CineMuseum LLC, a consortium of film archivists, secured exclusive rights to the Educational sound comedies, with plans to restore and re-release them to media outlets.

Logo

Educational Pictures's logo consists of a genie's lamp, above which the words "Educational Pictures" appear formed by the smoke from the lamp.  Below the lamp, enclosed in quotation marks are the words The Spice of the Program.

The use of the logo in film credits was unique to Educational. The shorts would begin with the opening title card, usually having "E. W. Hammons presents" at the top, followed by the title of the short. The Educational logo would then appear full screen. Normally, studios would have their logos appear before the opening titles, while Educational placed its logo after the opening credits. At the end, there would be a standard end title card with the mini-logo for Educational Pictures appearing somewhere in the end title.

Selected filmography

 Air Pockets (1924, with Lige Conley)
 The Iron Mule  (1925, with Al St. John, directed by Roscoe Arbuckle)
 The Movies (1925, with Lloyd Hamilton, directed by Roscoe Arbuckle)
 Drama Deluxe (1927, with Lupino Lane, directed by Roscoe Arbuckle)
 Honeymooniacs (1929, with Monty Collins, directed by Jules White)
 The Right Bed (1929, with Edward Everett Horton)
 Honeymoon Trio (1931, with Al St. John, Walter Catlett, and Dorothy Granger, directed by Roscoe Arbuckle)
 Windy Riley Goes Hollywood (1931, with Jack Shutta and Louise Brooks, directed by Roscoe Arbuckle)
 The Hitch Hiker (1932, with Harry Langdon and Vernon Dent)
 I Surrender Dear (1932, with Bing Crosby)
 Krakatoa (1933, narrated by Graham McNamee, produced by Joe Rock)
 Million Dollar Melody (1933, with Lillian Roth)
 Two Black Crows in Africa (1933, with Moran and Mack)
 Dora's Dunking Doughnuts (1934, with Andy Clyde and Shirley Temple)
 Going Spanish (1934, with Bob Hope)
 Hotel Anchovy (1934, with The Ritz Brothers, directed by Al Christie)
 Three Cheers for Love (1934, with Sylvia Froos and Warren Hull)
 Dumb Luck (1935, with the Easy Aces)
 Grooms in Gloom (1935, with Tom Howard and George Shelton)
 Hail, Brother (1935, with Billy Gilbert)
 Mr. Widget  (1935, with Joe Cook)
 Way Up Thar  (1935, with Joan Davis, directed by Mack Sennett)
 Blue Blazes (1936, with Buster Keaton)
 Gags and Gals (1936, with Jefferson Machamer)
 Grand Slam Opera (1936, with Buster Keaton)
 The Bashful Ballerina (1937, with Imogene Coca)
 Dates and Nuts (1937, with Herman Timberg, Jr. and Pat Rooney, Jr., and June Allyson)
 Jail Bait (1937 with Buster Keaton)
 Love Nest on Wheels (1937 with Buster Keaton)
 Montague the Magnificent (1937, with Bert Lahr)
 Playboy Number One (1937, with Willie Howard)
 All's Fair (1938, with The Cabin Kids)
 Getting an Eyeful (1938, with Danny Kaye)
 Col. Stoopnagle's Cavalcade of Stuff #2 with F. Chase Taylor (1939, the final Educational comedy)

References

External links

List of Educational Pictures films at IMDB

 
American companies established in 1916
Mass media companies established in 1916
Mass media companies disestablished in 1940
Film distributors of the United States
Defunct American film studios
Film production companies of the United States
Articles containing video clips